Visa requirements for Bosnia and Herzegovina citizens are administrative entry restrictions by the authorities of other states placed on citizens of Bosnia and Herzegovina.  Bosnia and Herzegovina citizens had visa-free or visa on arrival access to 117 countries and territories, ranking the Bosnia and Herzegovina passport 47th place overall, according to the Henley Passport Index.

In 2016, the Bosnia and Herzegovina passport was declared one of the five passports with the most improved rating since 2006.


Recent
On 3 August 2016 Bosnia and Herzegovina and Morocco signed an agreement to abolish visa requirements for the holders of diplomatic passports for period of 90 days. Belarus introduced 5 days visa-free access  to Bosnian citizens from 12 February 2017 if they arrive via Minsk International Airport, later expanded to 30 days. Lesotho introduced an e-Visa system on 1 May 2017 for Bosnian citizens. Qatar introduced an e-Visa system on 23 June 2017 for Bosnian citizens. On 1 January 2018, Japan abolished visa requirements for the holders of Bosnian diplomatic passports for period of 90 days. In March 2018, Colombia abolished visa requirements for Bosnian citizens. A visa-free agreement was signed with China on 28 November 2017 and it entered into force on 29 May 2018. E-visa available for Taiwan starting from 20 November 2019. As of 3 November 2022, Bosnia and Herzegovina and Kosovo formally signed an agreement abolishing visas.

Future
In December 2015 it was announced by the Government of Bosnia and Herzegovina that visa requirements for holders of regular biometric passports would be abolished for Argentina, Mexico and Japan while a simplified visa regime would be introduced with the United Kingdom.

Visa requirements map

Visa requirements

Territories and disputed areas
Visa requirements for Bosnia and Herzegovina citizens for visits to various territories, disputed areas and restricted zones:

Diplomatic and official passports only 

*  – for ordinary passport for 30 days within any 60 day period
** - VOA available

Non-visa restrictions

See also

Visa policy of Bosnia and Herzegovina
Bosnia and Herzegovina passport

References and Notes
References

Notes

Foreign relations of Bosnia and Herzegovina
Bosnia and Herzegovina